Tony Harper may refer to:

 Tony Harper (footballer) (1925–1982), English footballer
 Tony Harper (athlete) (1938–2013), Bermudian sprinter
 Tony Harper (American football), American football coach

See also
 Toni Harper (born 1937), former child singer